Calystegia macrostegia, with the common names island false bindweed and island morning glory, is a species of morning glory in the family Convolvulaceae.

Distribution
The plant is native to California coastal sage and chaparral habitats, along the coasts in Southern California and into Baja California, Mexico.

It is found on all the Channel Islands, source of its common names.  It is also commonly found in the Peninsular Ranges, Transverse Ranges, and Outer Southern California Coast Ranges.

Description
Calystegia macrostegia is a woody perennial herb or small shrub which may be a low herbaceous vine or a stout, woody, climbing plant which can approach  in length. The triangular leaves may be over 10 centimeters wide.

The vine produces white, to very pale pink, to lavender blooms, often according to drought or temperature.

Subspecies
Subspecies include:
Calystegia macrostegia ssp. amplissima
Calystegia macrostegia ssp. arida
Calystegia macrostegia ssp. cyclostegia
Calystegia macrostegia ssp. intermedia
Calystegia macrostegia ssp. macrostegia
Calystegia macrostegia ssp. tenuifolia

Cultivation
Calystegia macrostegia is cultivated as an ornamental plant, used as a vine and groundcover in native plant, drought tolerant, and wildlife gardens. It is a pollinator plant for native bee species.

References

External links

Calflora Database: Calystegia macrostegia (island morning glory, island false bindweed)
Jepson Manual eFlora treatment of Calystegia macrostegia
U.C. Photos gallery — Calystegia macrostegia

macrostegia
Flora of California
Flora of Baja California
Natural history of the California chaparral and woodlands
Natural history of the California Coast Ranges
Natural history of the Channel Islands of California
Natural history of the Peninsular Ranges
Natural history of the Santa Monica Mountains
Natural history of the Transverse Ranges
Garden plants of North America
Drought-tolerant plants
Vines
Flora without expected TNC conservation status